Karimba may refer to:

 Karimba, Palakkad, India
 Kaarimba, town in Victoria, Australia
 Karimba, an album by the Peruvian band Novalima
 A variation of the musical instrument Mbira

See also